The 2005 Michigan State Spartans football team represented Michigan State University in the 2005 NCAA Division I-A football season. Michigan State competed as a member of the Big Ten Conference, and played their home games at Spartan Stadium in East Lansing, Michigan. The Spartans were led by third-year head coach John L. Smith.

Schedule

Roster

Coaching staff
John L. Smith – Head Coach
Jim McElwain – Assistant head coach/wide receivers coach/special teams coordinator
Dave Baldwin – Offensive coordinator/Tight end coach
Doug Nussmeier – Quarterbacks coach
Ben Sirmans – Running backs coach
Jeff Stoutland – Offensive line coach
Chris Smeland – Defensive coordinator/safeties
Lucious Selmon – Defensive line coach
Mike Cox – Linebackers coach
Chuck Driesbach – Defensive backs coach

2006 NFL Draft
The following players were selected in the 2006 NFL Draft.

References

Michigan State
Michigan State Spartans football seasons
Michigan State Spartans football